Cyprichromis is a genus of cichlids with five species. They are also known as the herring cichlids or sardine cichlids,  since they form large schools in the open water of Lake Tanganyika. Of the known species, only C. microlepidotus has been recorded outside Lake Tanganyika (in eastern Tanzania).

Species
The currently recognized species in this genus are:
 Cyprichromis coloratus T. Takahashi & M. Hori, 2006
 Cyprichromis leptosoma (Boulenger, 1898)
 Cyprichromis microlepidotus (Poll, 1956)
 Cyprichromis pavo Büscher, 1994
 Cyprichromis zonatus T. Takahashi, M. Hori & Nakaya, 2002

References

 
Cyprichromini
Cichlid genera